Goin' to Rio is an album by Brazilian guitarist Bola Sete, released in 1973 through Columbia Records. In 2011, it was released as "Crystal Garden" accompanied by additional tracks from the same recording sessions.

Track listing

Release history

Personnel 
Milt Rogers – string arrangement
Bola Sete – guitar, string arrangement, production

References 

1973 albums
Bola Sete albums
Columbia Records albums